North Branch is a city in Chisago County, Minnesota, United States, at the junction of Interstate 35 and Minnesota State Highway 95. The population was 10,787 at the 2020 census. It is named for the north branch of the Sunrise River, which flows through the city.

Geography

History
North Branch became a township in 1861, and incorporated in 1881. In 1901 North Branch split into a village covering the more densely populated downtown area and a township covering the rest of the former village. The township later incorporated as the village of Branch in 1961. The two cities talked about a potential merger for years, beginning in the late 1970s. The first public referendum on the issue was held in 1984, and failed. A second referendum was held on September 13, 1994, and passed. The two cities officially merged on November 14, 1994.

Demographics

2020 census
As of the census of 2020, there were 10,787 people and 3,881 households. 94% of residents had at least a high school education, and 20.5% had attained a Bachelor's degree or higher. 4.9% were veterans. 

98.9% of residents were born in the United States, and 80.4% had been born in Minnesota. Among the foreign-born population, 85.0% were naturalized US citizens, the majority of whom were born in Asia. 97.3% of residents spoke only English at home.

The racial makeup of the city was 89.8% White alone (95.0% White alone or in combination), 2.1% Asian, 1.1% Black, 0.7% Native American, and 1.0% some other race. 5.3% were two or more races. The most common ancestries in North Branch were German (30.3%), Swedish (14.5%), Norwegian (13.2%), Irish (7.1%), and Polish (4.1%). Among cities with at least 10,000 people, North Branch has the highest concentration of people with Swedish ancestry in the United States.

Among workers 16 years and older, 81.6% commuted to work via car, 10.6% carpooled, 0.9% used public transit, and 2.4% walked, biked, or used some other method. 5.0% worked from home.  The median household income in North Branch was $85,213, slightly above the state average. 9.2% of residents lived below the poverty line, and 2.3% were unemployed. 85.8% of housing in the city was owner-occupied.

The average family size in North Branch was 3.21 persons, and 60.1% of households were married-couple families.

2010 census
As of the census of 2010, there were 10,125 people, 3,604 households, and 2,591 families living in the city. The racial makeup of the city was 96.6% White, 0.5% African American, 0.4% Native American, 0.8% Asian, 0.3% from other races, and 1.3% from two or more races. Hispanic or Latino of any race were 1.9% of the population.

There were 3,604 households, of which 42.4% had children under the age of 18 living with them, 57.3% were married couples living together, 9.8% had a female householder with no husband present, 4.9% had a male householder with no wife present, and 28.1% were non-families. 21.2% of all households were made up of individuals, and 9.1% had someone living alone who was 65 years of age or older. The average household size was 2.77 and the average family size was 3.25.

The median age in the city was 34.3 years. 29.3% of residents were under the age of 18; 7.7% were between the ages of 18 and 24; 30.4% were from 25 to 44; 22.2% were from 45 to 64; and 10.3% were 65 years of age or older. The gender makeup of the city was 49.8% male and 50.2% female.

2000 census
As of the census of 2000, there were 8,023 people, 2,815 households, and 2,147 families living in the city. The racial makeup of the city was 97.27% White, 0.16% African American, 0.49% Native American, 1.03% Asian, 0.04% Pacific Islander, 0.21% from other races, and 0.80% from two or more races. Hispanic or Latino of any race were 1.36% of the population.

There were 2,815 households, out of which 45.1% had children under the age of 18 living with them, 61.2% were married couples living together, 10.8% had a female householder with no husband present, and 23.7% were non-families.  18.7% of all households were made up of individuals, and 7.1% had someone living alone who was 65 years of age or older. The average household size was 2.85 and the average family size was 3.24.

In the city, the population was spread out, with 33.0% under the age of 18, 7.9% from 18 to 24, 34.5% from 25 to 44, 16.5% from 45 to 64, and 8.1% who were 65 years of age or older. The median age was 30 years. For every 100 females, there were 99.6 males. For every 100 females age 18 and over, there were 95.3 males.

The median income for a household in the city was $50,294, and the median income for a family was $56,512. Males had a median income of $39,478 versus $26,424 for females. The per capita income for the city was $20,875. About 3.1% of families and 5.0% of the population were below the poverty line, including 6.6% of those under age 18 and 5.0% of those age 65 or over.

Public schools
Sunrise River Elementary School
North Branch Area Middle School
North Branch Area High School

Notable people

 William J. Duffy – (1916–2013), jurist and legislator. Duffy served in the Wisconsin State Assembly 1949–1950, and was elected a Wisconsin Circuit Court judge for Brown County, Wisconsin serving until his retirement in 1992. Born in North Branch.
 Thomas H. Horton - (1859-1943), farmer and legislator
 Janet Johnson – Minnesota state senator
 Mark Koran – member of the Minnesota Senate
 Jon Lucivansky – NFL official 2009-2018
 Doug Mahnke – comic book writer
 Anne Neu – member of the Minnesota House of Representatives
 Rick Olseen – former member of the Minnesota Senate
 Matt Patrick, producer
 Becky Pearson – one-time LPGA Tour winning golfer and two-time winner of the Minnesota Junior Girls State Championship.
 Lee Quillen – former professional baseball player for Chicago White Sox
 Richard Warren Sears – telegraph operator and founder of Sears, Roebuck and Company
 Maynard W. Tollberg – sailor

In popular culture
 North Branch is the hometown of the character Tulip Olsen in the Cartoon Network/HBO Max animated science fiction thriller series Infinity Train.

References

External links
 City of North Branch
 North Branch Area Chamber of Commerce
 Independent School District #138
 North Branch at the Minnesota Historical Society.

Cities in Chisago County, Minnesota
Cities in Minnesota